Żary  is a village in the administrative district of Gmina Krzeszowice, within Kraków County, Lesser Poland Voivodeship, in southern Poland. The village is located in the historical region Galicia.

References

Villages in Kraków County